Cape Wrath (also known as Meadowlands) is a British television thriller drama series, created by Robert Murphy and Matthew Arlidge, that first broadcast in the United Kingdom on 10 July 2007 on Channel 4. Produced by Ecosse Films, the series focuses on the Brogan family, who are trying to escape their past while confronting an even more uncertain future.

The series was a co-production between Channel 4 in the UK and Showtime in the United States, where it received its world première on 17 June 2007, at 22:00 EST. During its original broadcast on Showtime, the series was accompanied by an interactive online experience, which following each episode, featured exclusive content detailing the background of a specific character from their life before they moved to Meadowlands, including their real name.

Due to low ratings, Channel 4 executives confirmed that a second series would not be commissioned. The complete series was released on Region 2 DVD on 27 August 2007. A quiz based upon the series is available to play on FunTrivia.

Plot
The series opens with Danny (David Morrissey) and Evelyn Brogan (Lucy Cohu) and their two teenage children, Zoe (Felicity Jones) and Mark (Harry Treadaway), entering a witness protection programme and moving to a bucolic neighbourhood known as Meadowlands to begin a new life. Picturesque and crime-free, Meadowlands appears to be a suburban paradise where the Brogan family can start a new life. However, they soon realise that it is not so easy to escape the past, and their haven becomes a world of paranoia and psychological intrigue with shocking surprises around every corner, especially the particularly stunning revelation that they can never leave.

Production
The series was filmed in Kent. Many of the interior sets were built in a warehouse close to The Maidstone Studios. The estate itself is in fact The Lakes, a new housing development built next to Leybourne Lakes Country Park. Kings Hill features as the local town centre. Other locations include The Kings Hill Golf Course, Wye College and Maidstone Leisure Centre.

Cast

 David Morrissey as Danny Brogan
 Lucy Cohu as Evelyn Brogan
 Ralph Brown as Bernard Wintersgill
 Tristan Gemmill as David York
 Melanie Hill as Brenda Ogilvie
 Nina Sosanya as Samantha Campbell
 Felicity Jones as Zoe Brogan
 Harry Treadaway as Mark Brogan
 Don Gilet as Freddie Marcuse
 Scot Williams as Tom Tyrell
 Ella Smith as Jezebel Ogilvie
 Sian Brooke as Lori Marcuse
 Emma Davies as Abigail York
 Tom Hardy as Jack Donnelly
 Sean Harris as Gordon Ormond

Episodes

References

External links
 

2007 American television series debuts
2007 American television series endings
2000s British drama television series
2007 British television series debuts
2007 British television series endings
Channel 4 original programming
Showtime (TV network) original programming
English-language television shows
Television shows shot in Kent
Television series about witness protection